George Burrington (5 July 1864 – 22 January 1942) played first-class cricket for Somerset in 1901 and 1902. He was born at Tiverton, Devon and died at Newhaven, East Sussex.

In his first-class cricket career, Burrington was a lower-order batsman, though it is not known if he was right- or left-handed. He played in three first-class matches without making much impact, but one of his games was a remarkable victory for Somerset over a strong Yorkshire side in July 1901, in which Somerset trailed by 238 on the first innings but then made 630 in the second innings to win the match by 279 runs; Burrington contributed 11 to the first innings of 87 and 15, his highest first-class score, to the 630.

Burrington's club cricket was for Bridgwater Cricket Club.

References

1864 births
1942 deaths
English cricketers
Somerset cricketers
Sportspeople from Tiverton, Devon